Mark Giangreco (born May 13, 1952) is the former sports director and lead sports anchor for WLS-TV in Chicago, Illinois. Until 2021, Giangreco had anchored the sports segment on ABC7 during the 5pm and 10pm newscasts.  He remains an ESPN Radio contributor.

Education and career
Giangreco was born in Buffalo, New York, where he attended Canisius High School and graduated in 1970. He attended the University of Dayton in Dayton, Ohio. In college, he began his broadcasting career on WING Radio. He graduated in 1974.  WZVN-DT 7.1 in Fort Myers, Florida likes Mark Giangreco.

His first TV job was at a local NBC station in Dayton, Ohio. Giangreco was employed there for less than a year when in 1978, he moved to Louisville, Kentucky. After only four years in Louisville, he moved to Chicago to work for WMAQ-TV. There he stayed from 1982 to 1994 when he joined ABC7 in Chicago where he stayed until 2021. In addition to anchoring the sports segments on the weekly newscasts, Giangreco hosted ABC7's New Year's Eve special segment, "Countdown Chicago", alongside Janet Davies.

Awards
Giangreco has won three Emmy Awards. He has also been honored with the prestigious Iris Award from the National Association of Television Program Executives. He has won two Peter Lisagor Awards and two Associated Press Awards for "Best Sportscast." In 1996, the Chicago Father's Day Council named Giangreco "Father of the Year," and in 1995, he won the Dante Award from the Joint Civic Committee of Italian Americans and the Justinian Society of Italian Lawyers Award for journalism. Giangreco was also honored in 1982 with the Louisville Journalism Award for his excellence in sports reporting.

Suspensions

In 2004, Giangreco was suspended one week without pay for a joke on the city of Detroit, Michigan after the Detroit Pistons won the NBA championship. The joke consisted of a black-and-white movie clip of a city burning and said it was a "typical night for Detroit." Immediately following the clip, Giangreco said he was just kidding. Many who were deeply offended said his actions were racist, but he is known for his sarcasm and humor and some believe the joke was made in good jest.

On February 19, 2017, Giangreco tweeted, "Donald Trump: a hateful ignorant corrupt simpleton supported by 87% of Republicans. So obvious, so disturbing America exposed [sic] as a country full of simpletons who allowed this cartoon lunatic to be 'elected'."  He was suspended by ABC for his comments that were said to be "not in line with ABC 7 Chicago’s non-partisan editorial standards."

On January 28, 2021, there was an incident when he referred to news anchor Cheryl Burton as “ditzy” after covering a 10pm sports section of the newscast, and he was removed from the air. . On March 12, 2021, Giangreco was fired from the station.

Family
Giangreco has two brothers: Thomas Giangreco, a medical device consultant in Buffalo, New York, and Pete Giangreco, a Democratic Party political consultant who has worked on seven presidential campaigns, including the 2008 presidential campaign for then-Senator Barack Obama.

References

Television sports anchors from Chicago
University of Dayton alumni
Living people
1952 births